Rugged Island (in Spanish Isla Rugosa, variant historical names Lloyds Island or Ragged Island) is an island  long and  wide, lying west of Livingston Island in the South Shetland Islands. Rugged Island was known to both American and British sealers as early as 1820, and the name has been well established in international usage for over 100 years.

History
Rugged Island was first visited in 1819 by the sealing vessel Espirito Santo chartered by English merchants in Buenos Aires, and commanded by Captain Joseph Herring.  The ship arrived at a bay on the north coast, known today as Hersilia Cove, where its English crew landed on Christmas Day 1819, and claimed the islands for King George III.  The Espirito Santo was joined on 23 January 1820 by the American brig Hersilia commanded by Captain James Sheffield (with first mate Elof Benson and second mate Nathaniel Palmer), the first American sealer in the South Shetlands.  A narrative of the events was published by Captain Herring in the July 1820 edition of the Imperial Magazine, London.

See also
 Composite Antarctic Gazetteer
 List of Antarctic islands south of 60° S
 Livingston Island
 SCAR
 South Shetland Islands
 Territorial claims in Antarctica

Maps
 Chart of South Shetland including Coronation Island, &c. from the exploration of the sloop Dove in the years 1821 and 1822 by George Powell Commander of the same. Scale ca. 1:200000. London: Laurie, 1822.
 South Shetland Islands. Scale 1:200000 topographic map No. 5657. DOS 610 – W 62 60. Tolworth, UK, 1968.
 Islas Livingston y Decepción.  Mapa topográfico a escala 1:100000.  Madrid: Servicio Geográfico del Ejército, 1991.
 Península Byers, Isla Livingston. Mapa topográfico a escala 1:25000. Madrid: Servicio Geográfico del Ejército, 1992. (Map image on p. 55 of the linked study)
 L.L. Ivanov et al. Antarctica: Livingston Island and Greenwich Island, South Shetland Islands. Scale 1:100000 topographic map. Sofia: Antarctic Place-names Commission of Bulgaria, 2005.
 L.L. Ivanov. Antarctica: Livingston Island and Greenwich, Robert, Snow and Smith Islands. Scale 1:120000 topographic map.  Troyan: Manfred Wörner Foundation, 2009.  
 Antarctic Digital Database (ADD). Scale 1:250000 topographic map of Antarctica. Scientific Committee on Antarctic Research (SCAR). Since 1993, regularly upgraded and updated.
 L.L. Ivanov. Antarctica: Livingston Island and Smith Island. Scale 1:100000 topographic map. Manfred Wörner Foundation, 2017.

References

External links
Rugged Island. SCAR Composite Antarctic Gazetteer

Islands of the South Shetland Islands
Seal hunting